Throughout the history of Afghanistan, there have been many flags used by rebel groups in Afghanistan's various conflicts. This is a list of the Afghan rebel flags flown by various groups throughout the country's history.

Afghan Civil War (1928–1929)

1973 Afghan coup d'état

Saur Revolution

1979 Herat uprising

Soviet–Afghan War

Afghan Civil War (1989–1992)

Afghan Civil War (1992–1996)

Afghan Civil War (1996–2001)

War in Afghanistan (2001–2021)

Rebel Groups in Afganistan (2021- Present)

See also 

 Flag of Afghanistan
 War in Afghanistan
 Afghanistan conflict (1978–present)

References

Flags of Afghanistan
Rebellions in Afghanistan
Modern history of Afghanistan